The Flying Mail was a train in India that operated between Delhi and Amritsar and, prior to India's partition, between Delhi and Karachi. The train began service in 1853 and was discontinued in 2001. Before the partition of India the Flying Mail ran from Karachi (now in Pakistan) to Delhi via Lahore and was the fastest train between two cities. The train shared a rake with the Sarayu Yamuna Express between Delhi and Amritsar until 2001 when the Sarayu Yamuna Express was renamed the Shaheed Express and extended to Amritsar. Today the Shaheed Express operates between Amritsar and Jainagar in Bihar four days a week. Prior to India's partition, the Flying Mail left Delhi at noon, arrived at 9 pm, before heading for Karachi. On the return journey from Karachi, the train arrived at Lahore at noon and at Delhi at 9pm.

References

External links
Flying Mail

Transport in Karachi
Transport in Delhi
Transport in Amritsar
Defunct trains in India
Rail transport in Punjab, India
Rail transport in Maharashtra